Michael of Duklja may refer to:

 Michael I of Duklja, Prince and King of Duklja and Serbia (d. 1081)
 Michael II of Duklja, King of Duklja, c. 1101-1102
 Michael III of Duklja, Prince of Duklja, from c. 1170 to 1186

See also
 Michael (disambiguation)
 George of Duklja (disambiguation)
 Vladimir of Duklja (disambiguation)
 Duklja